Following is a list of chapters of Chi Psi, which are known as Alphas. Active chapters in indicated in bold; inactive chapters are in italic.

Notes

References 

Lists of chapters of United States student societies by society
Chi Psi